The Gospel of the Ebionites is the conventional name given by scholars to an apocryphal gospel extant only as seven brief quotations in a heresiology known as the Panarion, by Epiphanius of Salamis; he misidentified it as the "Hebrew" gospel, believing it to be a truncated and modified version of the Gospel of Matthew. The quotations were embedded in a polemic to point out inconsistencies in the beliefs and practices of a Jewish Christian sect known as the Ebionites relative to Nicene orthodoxy.

The surviving fragments derive from a gospel harmony of the Synoptic Gospels, composed in Greek with various expansions and abridgments reflecting the theology of the writer. Distinctive features include the absence of the virgin birth and of the genealogy of Jesus; an Adoptionist Christology, in which Jesus is chosen to be God's Son at the time of his Baptism; the abolition of the Jewish sacrifices by Jesus; and an advocacy of vegetarianism. 

The omission of the genealogical records and the virgin birth of Jesus narrative is explained by Epiphanius as being because "they insist that Jesus was really man."

It is believed to have been composed some time during the middle of the 2nd century in or around the region east of the Jordan River. Although the gospel was said to be used by "Ebionites" during the time of the early church, the identity of the group or groups that used it remains a matter of conjecture.

The Gospel of the Ebionites is one of several Jewish–Christian gospels, along with the Gospel of the Hebrews and the Gospel of the Nazarenes; all survive only as fragments in quotations of the early Church Fathers. Due to their fragmentary state, the relationships, if any, between the Jewish–Christian gospels and a hypothetical original Hebrew Gospel are uncertain and have been a subject of intensive scholarly investigation. The Ebionite gospel has been recognized as distinct from the others, and it has been identified more closely with the lost Gospel of the Twelve.  It shows no dependence on the Gospel of John and is similar in nature to the harmonized gospel sayings based on the Synoptic Gospels used by Justin Martyr, although a relationship between them, if any, is uncertain. There is a similarity between the gospel and a source document contained within the Clementine Recognitions (1.27–71), conventionally referred to by scholars as the Ascents of James, with respect to the command to abolish the Jewish sacrifices.

Background 

Epiphanius is believed to have come into possession of a gospel that he attributed to the Ebionites when he was bishop of Salamis, Cyprus. He alone among the Church Fathers identifies Cyprus as one of the "roots" of the Ebionites.  The gospel survives only in seven brief quotations by Epiphanius in Chapter 30 of his heresiology the Panarion, or "Medicine Chest", (c. 377) as a polemic against the Ebionites. His citations are often contradictory and thought to be based in part on his own conjecture. The various, sometimes conflicting, sources of information were combined to point out inconsistencies in Ebionite beliefs and practices relative to Nicene orthodoxy, possibly to serve, indirectly, as a polemic against the Arians of his time.

The term Gospel of the Ebionites is a modern convention; no surviving document of the early church mentions a gospel by that name. Epiphanius identifies the gospel only as "in the Gospel used by them, called 'according to Matthew'" and "they call it 'the Hebrew [gospel]'". As early as 1689 the French priest Richard Simon called the text "Gospel of the Ebionites". The name is used by modern scholars as a convenient way to distinguish a gospel text that was probably used by the Ebionites from Epiphanius' mistaken belief that it was a Hebrew version of the Gospel of Matthew.  Its place of origin is uncertain; one speculation is that it was composed in the region east of the Jordan where the Ebionites were said to have been present, according to the accounts of the Church Fathers. It is thought to have been composed during the middle of the 2nd century, since several other gospel harmonies are known to be from this period.

Composition 
According to scholars Oskar Skarsaune and Glenn Alan Koch, Epiphanius incorporated excerpts from the gospel text at a late stage in the composition of Panarion 30, primarily in chapters 13 and 14. As Epiphanius describes it, "The Gospel which is found among them ... is not complete, but falsified and distorted ..." (13.1–2). In particular, it lacked some or all of the first two chapters of Matthew, which contain the infancy narrative of the virgin birth of Jesus and the Davidic genealogy via Solomon, "They have removed the genealogies of Matthew ..." (14.2–3).

There is general agreement about the seven quotations by Epiphanius cited in the critical edition of "Jewish Christian gospels" by Philipp Vielhauer and Georg Strecker, translated by George Ogg, in Schneemelcher's New Testament Apocrypha.  The translations of Bernhard Pick (1908), with the sequence of four fragments arranged in the order of Vielhauer & Strecker from the beginning of the gospel are as follows:

The three quotations by Epiphanius in Panarion 30.13.6, 4, and 7, respectively, form the opening of the gospel narrative, including the mission of John the Baptist, his appearance and diet, and the baptism of Jesus by John.  The beginning of the gospel (13.6) has parallels to the Gospel of Luke but in abbreviated form. The text shows a familiarity with the infancy narrative of Luke 1:5 despite lacking a birth narrative of its own. Quoting from the text regarding the diet of John (13.4), Epiphanius complains that the Ebionites have falsified the text by substituting the word "cake" (egkris ἐγκρίς) for "locust" (akris ἀκρίς, in Matthew 3:4). The similarity of the wording in Greek has led scholars to conclude that Greek was the original language of composition.  In the narrative of the baptism of Jesus by John (13.7), the voice of God speaks three times in close parallels to the Gospel of Mark 1:11, Luke 3:22 (Western text-type), and Matthew 3:17, respectively. The presence of multiple baptismal theophanies has led to a consensus among modern scholars that the text quoted by Epiphanius is a gospel harmony of the Synoptic Gospels. The appearance of a great light on the water may be an echo of St. Paul's conversion or an additional harmonization of the Gospel of the Hebrews to this work.

Epiphanius begins his description of the gospel text (13.2b–3) with a quotation which has the apostle Matthew narrating directly to the reader. Jesus recalls how the twelve apostles were chosen and addresses Matthew in the second person as "you also Matthew". Although twelve apostles are mentioned, only eight are named. They are said to be chosen by Jesus, "for a testimony to Israel". The phrase "who chose us" has been interpreted as evidence that the text may be the lost Gospel of the Twelve mentioned by Origen. However, the identification of the gospel text quoted by Epiphanius with this otherwise unknown gospel is disputed.  The position of this quotation was tentatively assigned based on a parallel to the Synoptic Gospels.

The fifth and sixth quotations (following Vielhauer & Strecker's order) are associated with a Christological controversy. The polemics of Epiphanius along with his quotations of the gospel text (in italics) are shown in parallel:

The fifth quotation (14.5) appears to be a harmony of Matthew 12:47–48 and its Synoptic parallels. However, Jesus' final proclamation shows a closer agreement to 2 Clement 9:11 than any of the Synoptics. The unity of this quotation with the gospel text in Chapter 13 has been questioned.  The command to abolish the sacrifices in the sixth quotation (16.5) is unparalleled in the Canonical Gospels, and it suggests a relationship to Matthew 5:17 ("I did not come to abolish the Law") that is echoed in the Clementine literature.

Referring to a parallel passage in Luke 22:15, Epiphanius complains that the Ebionites have again falsified the gospel text:

thereby making Jesus declare that he would not eat meat during the Passover. The immediate context suggests the possible attribution of the quotation to a Clementine source; however a linkage between the gospel fragments and the Clementine literature remains uncertain.

Christology 

The baptismal scene of the gospel text (13.7) is a harmony of the Synoptic Gospels, but one in which the Holy Spirit is said to descend to Jesus in the form of a dove and enter into him. This divine election at the time of his baptism is known as an Adoptionist Christology, and it is emphasized by the quotation of Psalm 2:7, as found in the "Western text" of Luke 3:22, "You are my son, this day I have begotten you." The Spirit entering into Jesus and the great light on the water are thought to be based on the prophecies of Isaiah 61:1 and 9:1, respectively. His Adoptionist son-ship is characterized by the belief that Jesus was a mere man, who, by virtue of his perfect righteousness, was imbued with the divinity of the eternal Christ through his Baptism in order to carry out the prophetic task for which he had been chosen.

The absence of any reference to a Davidic son-ship in the gospel text suggests that Jesus has been elected to be the end-time prophet, the Chosen One, sent to abolish the Jewish sacrifices. The Prophet-Christology of the gospel text quoted by Epiphanius is more at home with the Clementine literature than the Christology of the Ebionites known to Irenaeus. According to scholars Richard Bauckham and Petri Luomanen, Jesus is understood in this gospel as having come to abolish the sacrifices rather than substituting for them; thus it is unlikely that it contained the same institution of the Eucharist as practiced by Nicene orthodox Christianity. However, scholars have yet to reach a consensus over the sacrificial significance of Jesus' mission as depicted in the Ebionite gospel.

Vegetarianism 
The change in wording of the gospel text from "locust" (akris) to "cake" (egkris) for John the Baptist's diet (13.4) has been interpreted as evidence of Jewish vegetarianism. However, the association of the diet of John the Baptist with vegetarianism has been questioned.  Epiphanius gives no indication of concern for vegetarianism in this part of the Gospel text, and it may instead be an allusion to the manna in the wilderness of Exodus 16:31 and Numbers 11:8, or, according to scholar Glenn Alan Koch, to 1 Kings 19:6 where Elijah eats cakes in oil.

Further evidence has been found in the quotation based on Luke 22:15 (22.4), where the saying has been modified by insertion of the word "flesh" to provide a rationale for vegetarianism.  The immediate context of the quotation suggests that it may be closely related to a Clementine source, the Journeys of Peter. Reading from the same source, Epiphanius states that the Ebionites abstained from "meat with soul in it" (15.3), and he attributes this teaching to Ebionite interpolations "they corrupt the contents and leave a few genuine items". Due to the close association of this saying with the Clementine literature of the 3rd and 4th century, the earlier practice of vegetarianism by the 2nd-century Ebionites known to Irenaeus has been questioned. The strict vegetarianism of the Ebionites known to Epiphanius may have been a reaction to the cessation of Jewish sacrifices and a safeguard against the consumption of unclean meat in a pagan environment.

Relationship to other texts 
Epiphanius incorrectly refers to the gospel in his possession as the Gospel of Matthew and the gospel "according to the Hebrews", perhaps relying upon and conflating the writings of the earlier Church Fathers, Irenaeus and Eusebius, respectively. His 4th century colleague Jerome remarks that the Nazarenes and Ebionites both used the Gospel of the Hebrews, which was considered the original Matthew by many of them.  Jerome's report is consistent with the prior accounts of Irenaeus and Eusebius.

The relationship between the Gospel of the Ebionites, the Gospel of the Hebrews, and the Gospel of the Nazarenes remains unclear. All the Jewish–Christian gospels survive only as fragments in quotations, so it is difficult to tell if they are independent texts or variations of each other. Scholar Albertus Klijn established the modern consensus, concluding that the gospel harmony composed in Greek appears to be a distinctive text known only to Epiphanius. Scholar Marie-Émile Boismard has claimed the Ebionite gospel is partly dependent upon a hypothetical Hebrew gospel as a source; however this conjecture remains a minority view. Its putative relationship to the gospel text known to Origen as the Gospel of the Twelve remains a subject of scholarly debate.

The Ebionite gospel is one example of a type of gospel harmony that used the Gospel of Matthew as a base text but did not include the Gospel of John; it is believed to pre-date Tatian's Diatessaron (c. 170) which included all four canonical gospels. The gospel has a parallel to a quotation in a mid-2nd-century homily known as 2 Clement, suggesting that both may be dependent on a harmonizing tradition from an earlier 2nd century source. The harmonized gospel sayings sources used by Justin Martyr to compose his First Apology and Dialogue with Trypho were similarly based on the Synoptic Gospels. According to scholar George Howard, harmonization was a widely used method of composition in the early Patristic period. Many of the heterodox variants found in the Gospel of the Ebionites may have been adopted from a larger pool of variants that were in circulation; an example is the appearance of a great light that shone during Jesus' Baptism which is also found in the Diatessaron.

The Recognitions of Clement contains a source document (Rec. 1.27–71), conventionally referred to by scholars as the Ascents of James, which is believed to be of Jewish–Christian origin. The Ascents shares a similarity to the Gospel of the Ebionites with regard to the baptism of the Pharisees by John (Pan. 30.13.4; Rec. 1.54.6–7) and the command to abolish the Jewish sacrifices, adding that a Christian water baptism is to be substituted for the remission of sins. Based on these similarities, scholars Richard Bauckham and F. Stanley Jones have postulated a direct dependence of the Ascents of James on the Gospel of the Ebionites.

Inferences about the Ebionites 
The gospel Epiphanius attributed to the Ebionites is a valuable source of information that provides modern scholars with insights into the distinctive characteristics of a vanished branch of Jewish Christianity. However, scholars disagree on whether the information contained within the seven fragments preserved by Epiphanius accurately reflects the traditions of the second-century Ebionite sect known to Irenaeus, or if their belief system changed, perhaps greatly, over a span of 200 years compared to this early group. The Ebionites known to Irenaeus (first mentioned in Adversus Haereses 1.26.2, written around 185) and other Church Fathers prior to Epiphanius were described as a Jewish sect that regarded Jesus as the Messiah but not as divine. They insisted on the necessity of following Jewish law and rites and they used only the Jewish–Christian gospel. The Ebionites rejected the epistles of Paul of Tarsus, whom they regarded as an apostate from the Law.

In Epiphanius' polemic against the Ebionites found in Panarion 30, a complex picture emerges of the beliefs and practices of the 4th century Ebionites that cannot easily be separated from his method of combining disparate sources. While scholars such as Hans-Joachim Schoeps literally interpreted Epiphanius' account as describing a later syncretic development of Ebionism, more recent scholarship has found it difficult to reconcile his report with those of the earlier Church Fathers, leading to a conjecture by scholar Petri Luomanen that a second group of Hellenistic-Samaritan Ebionites may also have been present. The rejection of the Jewish sacrifices and the implication of an end-time prophet Christology due to the lack of a birth narrative lend support for the association of the Gospel of the Ebionites with a group or groups different from the Ebionites known to Irenaeus.

Scholarship in the area of Jewish Christian studies has tended to be based on artificial constructs similar to those developed by the early Christian heresiologists, with the underlying assumption that all of the beliefs and practices of these groups were based on theology. This has led to the perpetuation of ideological definitions that fail to take into account the pluriformity of these groups, reflecting differences in geography, time periods in history, and ethnicity. With respect to Epiphanius, and the Ebionites in particular, insufficient attention has been paid to the highly speculative nature of his theological constructs and his mixing together of disparate sources, including his use of a gospel harmony that may have had nothing to do with the Ebionite sect known to Irenaeus. In the end, he presents an enigmatic picture of the Ebionites and their place in early Christian history.

See also
List of Gospels

Notes

Citations

Sources 

 
 
 
 
 
 
 
 
 
 
 
 
 
 
 
 
 
 
 
 
 
 
 
 
 
 
 
 
 
 
  Republished in 2009.
 
  (translated by Douglas R.A. Hare)
 
 
 
 
 
  (6th German edition, translated by George Ogg)

Further reading

External links 

 Early Christian Writings – Gospel of the Ebionites

2nd-century books
2nd-century Christian texts
Ebionites